In computability theory, a semicomputable function is a partial function  that can be approximated either from above or from below by a computable function.

 
 

Completely analogous a partial function  is lower semicomputable if and only if  is upper semicomputable or equivalently if there exists a  computable function  such that:

 
 

If a partial function is both upper and lower semicomputable it is called computable.

See also
 Computability theory

References 

 Ming Li and Paul Vitányi, An Introduction to Kolmogorov Complexity and Its Applications, pp 37–38, Springer, 1997.

Mathematical logic